Chanuk Dilshan (born 7 November 1996) is a Sri Lankan cricketer. He made his first-class debut for Moors Sports Club in the 2017–18 Premier League Tournament on 7 February 2018. He made his Twenty20 debut for Moors Sports Club in the 2017–18 SLC Twenty20 Tournament on 2 March 2018. He made his List A debut for Moors Sports Club in the 2017–18 Premier Limited Overs Tournament on 14 March 2018.

References

External links
 

1996 births
Living people
Sri Lankan cricketers
Moors Sports Club cricketers
Nugegoda Sports and Welfare Club cricketers
Place of birth missing (living people)